Cattolica  (Catholic) may refer to:
 Cattolica, a town in the Province of Rimini, Italy
 Cattolica Eraclea, a town in Sicily
 Cattolica Assicurazioni, Italian insurance company
 Cattolica Popolare, a cooperative corporation 
 Banca Cattolica del Veneto, defunct Italian bank
 Banca Cattolica di Molfetta, defunct Italian bank
 Banca Cattolica di Montefiascone, defunct Italian bank
 Università Cattolica del Sacro Cuore, an Italian private research university